Kaz the Minotaur is a fantasy novel by Richard A. Knaak, set in the world of Dragonlance, and based on the Dungeons & Dragons role-playing game. It is the first novel in the "Heroes II" series. It was published in paperback in July 1990.

Kaz the Minotaur first appeared in The Legend of Huma. His story is continued in the short story Kaz and the Dragon's Children from The Dragons of Krynn and in Land of the Minotaurs.

Plot summary
Kaz the Minotaur is a novel that tells the story of Kaz the minotaur.

Reception

Reviews
Magia i Miecz #59 (November 1998) (Polish)

References

1990 novels
Dragonlance novels